was a Japanese actress. Her birth name was Shimizu Yoshiko. She appeared in more than 190 films between 1931 and 1961. She died of a cerebral hemorrhage in 1961 at the age of 42.

Selected filmography
 The Million Ryo Pot (1935)
 Fallen Blossoms (1938)
 Sanshiro Sugata (1943)
 Ginza Cosmetics (1951)
 Repast (1951)
 Life of a Woman (1953)
 Love Letter (1953)
 Entotsu no mieru basho (1953)
 Onna no Koyomi (1954)

References

External links

1918 births
1961 deaths
Japanese film actresses
People from Osaka
20th-century Japanese actresses